Mason Vincent Toye (born October 16, 1998) is an American professional soccer player who plays as a forward for Major League Soccer club CF Montréal.

Early life and education 
Born in South Orange, New Jersey, Toye attended Morristown-Beard School for his first two years of High School, before transferring to Seton Hall Preparatory School in West Orange, New Jersey where he graduated in 2017. He also went to the Winston School Of Short Hills.

Toye played one year at Indiana University before entering the 2018 MLS SuperDraft as a Generation Adidas player. At Indiana University, Toye made 21 starts and 25 appearances throughout the 2017 season. He tallied 10 goals and 2 assists in the 2017 campaign. Toye contributed to an undefeated 2017 season for the Hoosiers who ultimately lost 1–0 to Stanford University in the 2017 College Cup Final. Toye was named Big Ten Freshman of the Year and earned Big 10 All-First Team honors.

Playing career

Minnesota United 
On January 18, 2018, Minnesota United FC drafted Toye 7th overall in the 2018 MLS SuperDraft.

Toye made his professional debut on March 10, 2018, as a 72nd-minute substitute during a 2–1 victory over Orlando City.

Toye scored his first goal for Minnesota United FC in the 89th minute of their U.S. Open Cup match against the Houston Dynamo on June 18, 2019.

He scored his first MLS goal on June 29, 2019, in the 75th minute of their 7–1 victory against FC Cincinnati.

On July 13, 2019, he scored the winning goal in stoppage time against FC Dallas at Allianz Field for a 1–0 victory.

Colorado Springs Switchbacks (loan)
In August 2018, Toye was loaned out to USL club Colorado Springs Switchbacks FC until the end of the season. He made his league debut for the club on August 11, 2018 in a 2–1 away defeat to the Tulsa Roughnecks. He scored his first professional goal on September 1, 2018, as he scored in the 11th minute of a 3–1 away defeat to LA Galaxy II.

Forward Madison (loan)
In April 2019, Toye was loaned out once again, this time to Minnesota's USL affiliate Forward Madison FC ahead of their inaugural season. He made his league debut for the club on April 6, 2019 in a 1–0 away defeat to Chattanooga Red Wolves SC.

CF Montréal
On October 1, 2020, Toye was traded to the Montreal Impact, later renamed CF Montréal, in exchange for $150,000 in General Allocation Money for the remainder of 2020, $450,000 in General Allocation Money for 2021, and a second round pick in the 2021 MLS SuperDraft.

Career statistics

Club

References

External links
 
 
 

1998 births
Living people
African-American soccer players
American soccer players
Association football forwards
Indiana Hoosiers men's soccer players
Minnesota United FC players
Colorado Springs Switchbacks FC players
Forward Madison FC players
CF Montréal players
Minnesota United FC draft picks
Soccer players from New Jersey
Major League Soccer players
USL Championship players
Sportspeople from Essex County, New Jersey
People from South Orange, New Jersey
USL League One players
21st-century African-American sportspeople